Cliftonite is a natural form of graphite that occurs as small octahedral inclusions in iron-containing meteorites. It typically accompanies kamacite, and more rarely schreibersite, cohenite or plessite.

Cliftonite was first considered to be a new form of carbon, then a pseudomorph of graphite after diamond, and finally reassigned to a pseudomorph of graphite after kamacite. Cliftonite is typically observed in minerals that experienced high pressures. It can also be synthesized by annealing an Fe-Ni-C alloy at ambient pressure for several hundred hours. The annealing is carried out in two stages: first a mixture of cohenite and kamacite is formed in air at ca. 950 °C; it is then partly converted to cliftonite in vacuum at ca. 550 °C.

The Campo del Cielo region of Argentina is noted for a crater field containing a group of distinctive iron meteorites.

References

Native element minerals
Allotropes of carbon
Hexagonal minerals
Minerals in space group 194